Aruna Raje (born 1946) is an Indian film director and editor known for her works in Hindi cinema.

Early life
Aruna Raje was born on 17 October in 1946 in Pune, India.

Education and career
Aruna enrolled initially at Grant Medical College in Pune to study medicine but later quit to join the Film and Television Institute of India (FTII). She passed out of FTII with a gold medal in 1969 becoming the first trained woman technician in the industry.

At the beginning of her career Aruna Raje worked jointly with her ex-husband Vikas Desai in the name of Aruna-Vikas. She co-edited acclaimed films like Giddh and Masoom. The duo later took to direction making films like Shaque, Gehrayee and Sitam. After separating from her husband she began independent film-direction, making hard hitting feminist movies.

She has also made national award-winning documentaries on the well-known classical dancer Mallika Sarabhai and special children, The New Paradigm.

She has won 5 National Awards for her films.

Personal life
Aruna was married to Vikas Desai. They had a son and a daughter. The daughter aged nine died of cancer. The couple later divorced.

Filmography

Writer
2009 Red Alert: The War Within (story) 
2004 Tum – A Dangerous Obsession (screenplay and story) 
1996 Bhairavi (screenplay) 
1988 Rihaee (screenplay and story) 
1982 Sitam (co-written)
1980 Gehrayee (script)(co-written) 
1976 Shaque (script)(co-written)

Director
2019 Firebrand
2004 Tum – A Dangerous Obsession
1996 Bhairavi
1993 Shadi Ya... (TV Series) 
1992 Patit Pawan
1988 Rihaee
1982 Sitam (co-directed)
1980 Gehrayee (co-directed)
1976 Shaque (co-directed)

Editor
2004 Tum – A Dangerous Obsession
1996 Bhairavi
1988 Rihaee 
1984 Giddh (co-edited)
1984 Masoom (co-edited)
1982 Sitam (co-edited)
1980 Gehrayee (co-edited)
1976 Shaque (co-edited)

References

External links
 
 Arunaraje Patil on Shift Focus, a school for Cinema and Life

1946 births
Living people
Indian women film directors
Hindi-language film directors
20th-century Indian film directors
Indian women screenwriters
Indian documentary filmmakers
Indian women television directors
Indian television directors
Hindi screenwriters
20th-century Indian women writers
20th-century Indian dramatists and playwrights
21st-century Indian film directors
Film directors from Maharashtra
Artists from Pune
Women artists from Maharashtra
Screenwriters from Maharashtra
Indian women documentary filmmakers